Father Jacques P. Gagey (born 1954 in Vesoul) is a French Roman Catholic priest of the Archdiocese of Paris and author, who serves as the World Chaplain and World Ecclesiastical Assistant of the International Catholic Conference of Scouting (ICCS), based in Rome, and served as the Chaplain General of the Scouts et Guides de France.

Gagey was instrumental in the promotion of World Youth Day 1997 in Paris, the pilgrimage to Chartres and the pilgrimage to Vézelay.

On 1 September 2007, he succeeded Father Jean-Marie Mallet-Guy in the position of Chaplain General of the Scouts and Guides of France (SGdF). In November 2013, the Board of Scouts and Guides of France appointed a number of those involved in Scouting, including Gagey, as honorary members of the Scouts and Guides of France.

Having reached the end of his second term of three years as Chaplain General of the Scouts and Guides of France, Gagey became deputy ecclesiastical assistant of the International Catholic Conference of Scouting. In 2013, he was appointed chaplain of the International Catholic Conference of Scouting. He succeeded Father Leo A. White of the diocese of Manchester, New Hampshire as ecclesiastical assistant on 1 January 2014.

In his position, he has traveled as far afield as Japan and Curaçao.

References

External links
https://fr.scoutwiki.org/Jacques_Gagey
http://saintlouis-rome.net/evenement/conference-scoutisme/
http://www.eglise.catholique.fr/sengager-dans-la-societe/la-famille/les-enfants-et-les-jeunes/366567-jesus-lami-du-scoutisme-par-le-pere-jacques-gagey/

Living people
Scouting and Guiding in France
1954 births
People from Vesoul